Bill Weeden (born August 8, 1940) is an American film and stage actor, comedy writer, and songwriter.

Early life
Weeden was born on August 8, 1940, in Melbourne, Florida He graduated from Yale University in 1962.

Film and television career
Weeden is known for his work in genre film, starring in a number of Troma productions and other indie films, including playing the lead villain, Reginald Stuart, in Sgt. Kabukiman N.Y.P.D. (1990),. He was called the "Troma Olivier" by the New York Post for the performance.

Weeden starred in Rachel Mason's rock-opera The Lives of Hamilton Fish (2013) as the serial killer Hamilton Fish, whose life is contrasted with the lawmaker with the same name.

Weeden is the only actor in the "slow cinema" film Byron Jones.

In 2020, Weeden starred as the protagonist, Dr. ZOOmis, alongside Kansas Bowling in the parody film Psycho Ape!.

In 2021, Weeden received a Best Actor award for his leading performance as a conflicted war veteran in the suspense-drama short film RedSin.

Weeden stars in the mockumentary film The Once and Future Smash, which premiered at FrightFest in London in August 2022 and at Screamfest in Los Angeles in October 2022.

Stage career
Weeden is the composer of the Broadway show Hurry, Harry (opened 1972) and composed additional material for the Broadway show I'm Solomon (opened 1968).

Weeden played Hucklebee in the final cast of the original Sullivan Street production of The Fantasticks, which closed in 2002. He was also featured in Try to Remember: The Fantasticks, a documentary examining the history of the show.

He created two original musical revues with performing and writing partners David Finkle and Sally Fay (as Weeden, Finkle & Fay) for the New York production company Playwrights Horizons and a children's musical, Babar's Birthday, for Theatreworks/USA. The trio also toured as major market performers for a show organized by Fortune Magazine specifically to entertain and court potential advertisers, even receiving front-page coverage for the act in the Wall Street Journal. The trio also wrote the musical Move It and It’s Yours, which has been performed numerous times in regional theater.

The musical revue Into the Weeds: Selections from the Bill Weeden Songbook features Weeden's songs, including his various collaborations.

Weeden has also performed in a number of off-Broadway and touring shows, including an East Village outdoor production of As You Like It, George Bataille's Bathrobe, The Magnificent Ambersons, an Atlantic City production of Little Shop of Horrors, The Rocky Horror Show, The Wizard of Oz, and Damn Yankees.

Weeden (with Finkle and Fay) contributed several songs to The No-Frills Revue, the 1987 off-Broadway musical conceived by Martin Charnin.

Comedy
Weeden has written comedy material, often with writing partner David Finkle, for Lily Tomlin, Carol Channing, Stiller & Meara, Dick Shawn, Madeline Kahn, and others.

Weeden, Finkle & Fay's "Part of the Problem (The Inflation Song)" was released on 7" on MCA Records in 1980.

Weeden has often collaborated with Upright Citizens Brigade, including the comedy video "Author Wrote a F***ing Book," a parody of James Patterson's commercials, written by Achilles Stamatelaky and directed by Ryan Hunter.

Weeden played the father of correspondent/comedian Jordan Klepper on a 2015 episode of "The Daily Show."

Other work
He has narrated a number of audio books, often paired with his wife Dolores McDougal.

The song "One Big Team" was written and performed by Weeden for the 1988 New York Yankees' Old Timer's Day, and in 2006 by Tony-winning Broadway star James Naughton on the YES Network's Yankees Magazine.

Weeden joins other horror filmmakers and performers, such as Larry Fessenden and Amy Seimetz, voicing the horror "radio" series Tales from Beyond the Pale.

Select filmography 
Sgt. Kabukiman N.Y.P.D. (1990) - Reginald Stuart
Citizen Toxie: The Toxic Avenger IV (2000) - Abortion Doctor
Never Again (2001) - Mr. Speedy
Try to Remember: The Fantasticks (2003) - Self
Bill W. (2012) - Financier
The Lives of Hamilton Fish (2013) - Hamilton 'Albert' Fish
Applesauce (2015) - Kate's Father
The Ungovernable Force (2015) - Kevin
Are We Not Cats (2016) - Diner Dad
Shakespeare's Sh*tstorm (2020) - Singing Executive
Psycho Ape (2020) - Dr. ZOOmis
Ramekins: Ramekin II (2021) - Jared
 RedSin (2021) - Gregg Schulls/Jack Polaski
 The Once and Future Smash (2022) - William Mouth

References

External links

1940 births
Living people
Broadway composers and lyricists
Songwriters from Florida
American male songwriters
20th-century American male actors
21st-century American male actors
Male actors from Florida
American male comedy actors
American male film actors
American male stage actors
American comedy writers
People from Melbourne, Florida
21st-century American male writers
20th-century American male writers
Yale University alumni
Troma Entertainment films
Audiobook narrators
MCA Records artists
Male actors from New York City
Songwriters from New York (state)
Writers from New York City